Egla Harxhi was born in 1991, in Tirana, Albania. She is a beauty pageant contestant who won the Miss Albania 2007 contest at the age of 16.
She is the youngest Albanian to win the Miss Albania award and compete in the Miss World pageant. She competed in the 2008 Miss World beauty pageant held in Johannesburg,  South Africa. After this experience she stopped her career in modeling and beauty pageants.

Private life 
She is married to Alexandre Ale de Basseville. They have a son.

References

1991 births
Albanian beauty pageant winners
Albanian female models
Date of birth missing (living people)
Living people
Miss World 2008 delegates
People from Tirana
21st-century Albanian models